Mauléon Aerodrome (ICAO: LFJB) is a civil airfield, open to public aeronautical circulation (CAP)1, located  east-south-east of Mauléon, Deux-Sèvres in the Nouvelle-Aquitaine region of France.

This airfield is used for leisure activities and tourism (light aviation and helicopter).

History 
Near the airfield runway, the Bocage flying club was created in 1983. In 2014, an ultralight aviation section was created.

Facilities 
The airfield has one asphalt paved runway, designated 04/22, which measures .

It has a diurnal and nocturnal marking (low intensity lights).

The aerodrome is not controlled. Communications are carried out in self-information on the frequency of 123.500 MHz.

It is approved with limitations for night visual flight rules (VFR) flight.

Added to this are present:
 A parking area
 Hangars
 Fueling station (110LL)2

See also 
 Aero club
 Directorate General for Civil Aviation
 List of airports in France

References

External links 
 Bocage flying club

Airports in Nouvelle-Aquitaine